Christiana Hundred is an unincorporated subdivision of New Castle County, Delaware.  Hundreds were once used as a basis for representation in the Delaware General Assembly, and while their names still appear on all real estate transactions, they presently have no meaningful use or purpose except as a geographical point of reference.

Boundaries and formation
Christiana Hundred is that portion of New Castle County that lies north of the Christina River and White Clay Creek, west of the Brandywine Creek and east of the Red Clay Creek, excepting that portion in the southeast included in Wilmington Hundred.  Its northern boundary follows a portion of the 12 mile arc drawn around the town of New Castle.  It was one of the original hundreds in Delaware created in 1682 and was named for the Christina River that flows along its southern boundary.  When created it included some of the area now in Mill Creek Hundred, White Clay Hundred, and Pencader Hundred, all of which were split off in 1710.  It also included much of the area now in Wilmington Hundred, which was split off 1833.

Development
While the northern half of the hundred remains the wooded and semi-rural “Chateaux country” of country estates and expensive developments, the southern half is completely urban and suburban with almost continuous industrial, commercial and residential development.  The southeastern portion was built out early in the twentieth century with the remainder in the decades following World War II.  The towns of Elsmere and Newport, and Greenville Census Designated Places (CDP), and the community of Centreville are in Christiana Hundred.

Geography
Important geographical features, in addition to the Christiana River, White Clay Creek, Red Clay Creek, and Brandywine Creek, include the Hoopes Reservoir.  It is mostly in the Piedmont region, but the southern portion is below the eastern Fall Line and on the coastal plain. It is split by the January freezing isotherm into a humid subtropical climate (Cfa) in the south and a hot-summer humid continental climate (Dfa) in the north. Average monthly temperatures in Elsmere range from 32.5° F in January to 76.7″ F in July.  The hardiness zone is 7a.

Transportation
Important roads include portions of Interstate 95, Centre Road (Delaware Route 141), Kennett Pike (Delaware Route 52), Montchanin Road (Delaware Route 100), Lancaster Pike (Delaware Route 48), the Kirkwood Highway (Delaware Route 2), and the old main highway between Wilmington and Baltimore, now Maryland Avenue and its extension, Newport-Stanton Pike (Delaware Route 4).  A portion of the Philadelphia, Wilmington and Baltimore Railroad, subsequently the main north–south line of the Pennsylvania Railroad, now Amtrak's Northeast Corridor, crosses through Newport, and a portion of the old Baltimore and Ohio Railroad, now CSX Transportation's Philadelphia Subdivision crosses through Elsmere.  The East Penn Railroad runs from Elsmere generally along Montchanin Road and the Wilmington and Western Railroad runs along Red Clay Creek.

Hundreds in New Castle County, Delaware